Bruckner's Psalm 114, WAB 36, is a psalm setting of verses 1 to 9 of a German version of Psalm 116, which is Psalm 114 in the Vulgata.

History 
The work was composed in 1852 in St. Florian. Bruckner dedicated it to Hofkapelmeister Ignaz Assmayr for the celebration of his name-day. The work was rehearsed at that time, but it was not followed by a public performance. The original manuscript, which is somewhat incomplete in detail, is stored in the archive of the St. Florian Abbey.

The work was premiered by August Göllerich on 1 April 1906, using a copy of the manuscript.

During a concert on 25 June 2017 with the Missa solemnis, Łukasz Borowicz with the RIAS Kammerchor and the Akademie für Alte Musik Berlin performed also Bruckner's Psalm 114. The later Accentus CD ACC 30429 of this concert did however not include a recording of this performance of Psalm 114.

Text 
 (Thanks for salvation from great perils)

Setting 
The 209-bar long work in G major is written for five-part mixed choir (SAATB) and three trombones.

"The music is at first of an impressive archaic austerity, bare in harmony, and strikingly simple in texture. E minor is the opening key, but G major ultimately dominates." The structure of the psalm, which is quite simple in concept, is grounded on liturgical practice. The composition begins with a four-phrase, homophonically constructed Alleluja, which serves as an antiphon to the psalm setting. The individual verses, with the exception of verses seven and eight, are clearly separated by strong cadences or a few beats of silence. "[Bruckner] relied to the trombones to reinforce contrasts delineated by the silences that would become so poignant in his later music." The trombones are so reinforcing the contrasts between "Es umgaben mich die Schmerzen des Todes" (shift to minor) and "Kehre zurück meine Seele" (return to major). The truly inspired work, which projects a profound understanding of the text, captivates the ear with interesting harmonies and varied timbres and textures. The final words of verse eight ("meinen Füße vom Falle."), which are set in a two-voice canon over a dominant pedal, provide an effective bridge to the large-scale, five-voice double fugue, which ends with a powerful unison on "im Lande der lebendigen."

Bruckner's Psalm 114 is an aurally pleasing and expressive composition that does not deserve the near oblivion to which it has been relegated. It represents another important step in his slow process toward a purely musical career.

Discography 
There are three recordings of Bruckner's Psalm 114:
 Johannes Rühl, Anton Bruckner zum 175. Geburtstag, Capella Kreuzberg, members of the Berlin State Opera, 1999 - CD issued by the choir
 Mark Forkgen, Sing Praises, London Concert Choir, Alexander Mason (organ), 2002 - CD issued by the choir (with organ instead of trombones)

References

Sources 
 Cornelis van Zwol, Anton Bruckner – Leven en Werken, Thot, Bussum (Netherlands), 2012. 
 John Williamson, The Cambridge Companion to Bruckner, Cambridge University Press, 2004. 
 Keith William Kinder, The Wind and Wind-Chorus Music of Anton Bruckner, Greenwood Press, Westport CT, 2000. .
 Uwe Harten, Anton Bruckner. Ein Handbuch. , Salzburg, 1996. .
 Anton Bruckner – Sämtliche Werke, Band XX/1: Psalm 114 (1852), Musikwissenschaftlicher Verlag der Internationalen Bruckner-Gesellschaft, Paul Hawkshaw (Editor), Vienna, 1997

External links 
 
 Psalm 114 (116) G-Dur, WAB 36 Critical discography by Hans Roelofs  
 A live performance by Andrew Lewis with the Elgin Master Chorale (26 February 2018) can be heard on YouTube: Anton Bruckner - Psalm 114 in G major, WAB 36

Psalms by Anton Bruckner
Choral compositions
1852 compositions
Compositions in G major